Konechnaya is a rural locality (a village) in Beketovskoye Rural Settlement, Vozhegodsky District, Vologda Oblast, Russia. The population was 5 as of 2002.

Geography 
The distance to Vozhega is 66 km, to Beketovskaya is 10 km. Yelenskaya, Rakishevo, Mitrofanovo, Syrnevo, Vrazhnaya, Pankovo are the nearest rural localities.

References 

Rural localities in Vozhegodsky District